"Lag Jaa Gale" is a Hindi song with music by Madan Mohan Kohli and lyrics by Raja Mehdi Ali Khan, written for the 1964 Bollywood film Woh Kaun Thi? under the music label Saregama. On the screen, the song was performed by the film's star Sadhana, though actually sung by playback singer Lata Mangeshkar.

In Indian musical tradition

The music is set in Raga Pahari. The song is an example of Dadra songs.

"Lag Jaa Gale" since 1964

Lata Mangeshkar's career spanned more than 70 years (starting in 1942), recording thousands of songs. This iconic song   is regarded to be one of the songs by which Lata Mangeshkar is remembered. Lata herself considered this song to be among her top six favourite songs in 2016 and among her favourite 20 in 2012.

In 2014, on the fiftieth anniversary of the song, she tweeted: "" ("This year the song 'Lag ja gale ke phir ye hasee'n raat' is 50 years old, but it is so sweet, it does not feel old at all")  The singer  Amit Mishra claims that  "My favourite song by Lata ji is 'Lag Ja Gale' and I can hear it a million times on repeat mode"

Lyrics

In the song, the singer expresses that this evening may the last time she will see her beloved.
Below, the song is transcribed in Devanagari (Hindi), Nastaʿlīq (Urdu) and English

"" refers to embracing such that the necks touch, it can apply to two persons of the same sex as well.

The song expresses profound sadness on the impending partition, which is perhaps final. The Hindi expression "" implies that it may or may not happen in future. In Hinduism, death is the parting for this life. The parting, although expresses separation of two lovers in the movie, can also mean death in the Indian context. Some individuals remember having sung this song for the dying grandmother. Others member a close relative, with impending death due to cancer, dancing her last dance with this song. It is sometimes sung at Indian funerals.

It is also considered to be an iconic song composed by Madan Mohan.

In popular culture
It is said that for the movie Woh Kaun Thi, the song was originally rejected by the movie director. He decided to include it when he heard it the second time.

When the former star Sadhana died in 2015, she was often recalled by referring to her as the actress of this song.

The actor Irrfan Khan, who died on 29 April 2020 after a battle with cancer, used to listen to this song during his last days.

Renditions
In 1966, two movies used the song: in the Tamil movie Yaar Nee?, it is rendered as "", and in the Telugu movie Aame Evaru? it is rendered as "".

In 1968, Shipra Bose rendered a Bengali version of the same song, "Shongi je ke e monke amar aaj dolalo". The song was penned in Bengali by Miltu Ghosh.

The singer Shreya Ghoshal performed the song in concert several times in the 2010s.

Its rendition by the band Sanam has been so popular that some teenagers think they originally sang it. It has also been sung by several singers in Pakistan. The film Kedarnath, starring Sushant Singh Rajput, who died on 14 June 2020, features a rendition by Sanam's singer Sanam Puri.

A rendition of the song sung by Jonita Gandhi featured in 2018 film Saheb, Biwi Aur Gangster 3.

Remembered after Lata Mangeshkar's Death

The song was widely remembered after Lata's death. Bollywood actor Salman Khan tearfully sang the a few lines of the song and shared it with social media. About 40 young Pakistani musicians recorded their rendering as a tribute. Malayalam composer Kailas Menon said that ‘Lag Ja Gale’ is one of the best recordings in Indian cinema. Pakistan's Geo News mentioning Sufi singer Abida Parveen's tribute called Lata "The Lag Jaa Gale singer". Israel's Liora Itzhak in her tribute recalled "Lag jaa gale" as the first song she remembered. The song was also recalled by Pakistani actor Mahira Khan

References

Hindi film songs
Hindi songs
Indian songs
Number-one singles in India
1964 songs
Lata Mangeshkar songs
Shreya Ghoshal songs